Pepel (romanized: Pépeli) is a village in Gjirokastër County, southern Albania. At the 2015 local government reform it became part of the municipality of Dropull. It is inhabited solely by Greeks.

Holy Trinity Monastery Church is located within the village, a Religious Cultural Monument of Albania.

Demographics 
According to Ottoman statistics, the village had 392 inhabitants in 1895. The village had 505 inhabitants in 1993, all ethnically Greeks.

References

External links 
Different views of Pepel

Villages in Gjirokastër County
Greek communities in Albania